Maria Dulce de Oliveira Almada Duarte (1933-2019) was a Cape Verdean linguist who was a member and resistance fighter of the African Party for the Independence of Guinea and Cape Verde.

Biography

Early life and education
Duarte was born in 1933 on the island of São Vicente.  She later studied Romance languages at the University of Coimbra.  She supported the idea of anticolonialism and supported the independence struggle in Cape Verde and Portuguese Guinea (now Guinea-Bissau).

Struggle for resistance
She returned to Cape Verde in 1959 but only for a short time.  She was not allowed to travel to Portuguese Guinea.  Duarte visited France and attended the University of Caen. Later she went to Algeria and Morocco and later Senegal and then Guinea and she joined the African Party for the Independence of Guinea and Cape Verde (PAIGC) directly.

In her struggle or the independence, she done various tasks. She even had a radio interview and co-produced a radio program in Portuguese to demoralize colonial troops in support for resistance fighters. She wrote a number of articles for Libertação (Liberation) for the PAIGC, she translated works made by Amílcar Cabral into French.  She also worked with her future husband Abílio Duarte, also a fighter for the PAIGC.

After independence
After independence, she worked in different government departments including the Ministry of Culture and Education.

Later, she focused on her original discipline in Romance language and linguistics and published numerous works in Cape Verdean Creole. According to her own statement, she supported the officialization of the Cape Verdean Creole.

Works
 Cabo Verde. Contribuição para o estudo do dialecto falado no seu arquipélago (1961). Lisbon: Junta de Investigações do Ultramar, Issue 55 of Estudos de ciências políticas e sociais.
 Bilinguismo ou Diglossia [Bilingualism or Diglossia] (1998). Praia, Cabo Verde : Spleen.

References

1933 births
2019 deaths
People from São Vicente, Cape Verde
Linguists from Cape Verde
Cape Verdean women in politics
20th-century women politicians
20th-century linguists
20th-century translators
Cape Verdean translators
Portuguese–French translators
University of Coimbra alumni